Legacy is the seventeenth studio album by the country rock band Poco, released in 1989.  The album reunited the five original members of the group (from the Pickin' Up the Pieces album) and contained two top-40 singles, "Call It Love" and "Nothin' to Hide".

Legacy was the second Poco album to be certified gold.

Track listing

Original vinyl LP
"When It All Began" (Steve Pasch, Anthony "M." Krizan, Richie Furay, Scott Sellen) – 3:36
"Call It Love" (Ron Gilbeau, Billy Crain, Rick Lonow, Jim Messina) – 4:17
"The Nature of Love" (Jeff Silbar, Tommy Stephenson) – 4:03
"What Do People Know" (Rusty Young) – 3:52
"Follow Your Dreams" (Messina) – 2:56
"Rough Edges" (Young, Radney Foster, Bill Lloyd) – 3:08
"Nothin’ to Hide" (Richard Marx, Bruce Gaitsch) – 5:12
"Who Else" (Young, Mike Noble) – 4:01
"Lovin’ You Every Minute" (Messina, Michael Brady) – 3:10
"If It Wasn’t for You" (Furay, Scott Sellen) – 4:16

CD version
"When It All Began" (Steve Pasch, Anthony "M." Krizan, Richie Furay, Scott Sellen) – 3:36
"Call It Love" (Ron Gilbeau, Billy Crain, Rick Lonow) – 4:17
"The Nature of Love" (Jeff Silbar, Van Stephenson) – 4:03
"What Do People Know" (Rusty Young) – 3:52
"Nothin’ to Hide" (Richard Marx, Bruce Gaitsch) – 5:12
"Look Within" (Messina) – 5:03
"Rough Edges" (Young, Radney Foster, Bill Lloyd) – 3:08
"Who Else" (Young, Mike Noble) – 4:01
"Lovin’ You Every Minute" (Messina, Michael Brady) – 3:10
"If It Wasn’t for You" (Furay, Scott Sellen) – 4:16
"Follow Your Dreams" (Messina) – 2:56

Personnel

Poco 
 Jim Messina – guitars, vocals, lead vocals on "Follow Your Dreams," "Lovin' You Every Minute," and "Look Within"
 Richie Furay – guitars, 12-string guitar, vocals, lead vocals on "When It All Began" and "If It Wasn't for You"
 Rusty Young – steel guitar, banjo, dobro, guitars, acoustic piano, vocals, lead vocals on "Call It Love," "What Do People Know," and "Who Else"
 Randy Meisner – bass, vocals, lead vocals on "The Nature of Love," "Rough Edges," and "Nothin' to Hide"
 George Grantham – drums, vocals

Additional musicians 
 Brian Mendelsohn – Synclavier programming 
 Bill Payne – keyboards
 C.J. Vanston – keyboards
 Frank Marocco – accordion 
 Bruce Gaitsch – acoustic guitar, arrangements on "Nothin' to Hide"
 Joe Chemay – bass
 Leland Sklar – bass
 Gary Mallaber – drums
 Jeff Porcaro – drums
 Paulinho da Costa – percussion
 Richard Marx – vocals, arrangements on "Nothin' to Hide"

Production 
 David Cole – producer (1-4, 6-11), engineer (1-4, 6-11), mixing (1-4, 6-11)
 Richard Marx – producer (5)
 Rick Holbrook – engineer (5), mixing (5)
 Peter Doell – additional engineer, assistant engineer 
 Ken Felton – assistant engineer 
 Steve Holroyd – assistant engineer 
 Jesse Kanner – assistant engineer
 Laura Livingston – mix assistant 
 Wally Traugott – mastering at Capitol Studios (Hollywood, California).
 John Ciasulli – technical assistance
 Ross Garfield – technical assistance
 Suzanne Marie Edgren – production coordinator 
 DNZ, The Design Group – art direction, design 
 Jim Shea – photography 
 Lendon Flanagan – illustration

References

Poco albums
1989 albums
RCA Records albums
Albums recorded at Capitol Studios
Albums recorded at United Western Recorders